Leucine rich repeat containing 3 is a protein that in humans is encoded by the LRRC3 gene.

References

Further reading